Sultanmurat Khayimatovich Miraliyev (born 13 October 1990) is a Kazakhstani road and track cyclist, who currently rides for UCI Continental team . Representing Kazakhstan at international competitions, Miraliyev won the bronze medal at the 2016–17 UCI Track Cycling World Cup, Round 2 in Apeldoorn in the points race.

Major results

Track

2015
 1st  Madison, National Track Championships (with Dias Omirzakov)
2016
 National Track Championships
1st  Individual pursuit
1st  Points race
1st  Scratch
1st  Madison (with Dias Omirzakov)
 UCI World Cup
3rd  Points race, Apeldoorn
2017
 Asian Track Championships
1st  Omnium
2nd  Madison (with Artyom Zakharov)
2018
 1st  Omnium, National Track Championships
2020
 National Track Championships
1st  Individual pursuit
1st  Team pursuit
2021
 National Track Championships
1st  Omnium
1st  Madison (with Andrey Betts)

Road
2016
 4th Time trial, National Road Championships
2022
 8th Grand Prix Justiniano Hotels
 8th Grand Prix Megasaray

References

External links

1990 births
Living people
Kazakhstani male cyclists
Kazakhstani track cyclists
Sportspeople from Astana
Cyclists at the 2018 Asian Games
Asian Games competitors for Kazakhstan